What's New, Scooby-Doo? is an American animated television series produced by Warner Bros. Animation for Kids' WB. It is the ninth incarnation of the Scooby-Doo franchise that began with Scooby-Doo, Where Are You! and the first Scooby-Doo series in a decade, since A Pup Named Scooby-Doo ended in 1991 and the first since both the foreclosure of Hanna-Barbera studios and William Hanna's death in 2001.

The show follows the format of Scooby-Doo, Where Are You!, in which Scooby-Doo, and his companions Fred, Daphne, Velma, and Shaggy, travel to varying locations solving mysteries; this format is modernized for What's New, Scooby-Doo?, in which the characters utilize technology that did not exist at the time Scooby-Doo, Where Are You! first aired. It is the first television series in the franchise in which Frank Welker, Grey DeLisle and Mindy Cohn respectively portrayed the voices of Scooby-Doo, Daphne, and Velma, and where Casey Kasem made his comeback as Shaggy after five years of not voicing the character. This would also be the final Scooby-Doo series where Casey Kasem voices the character before his retirement in 2013 and his death in 2014, though he would still have voice work in the two following incarnations, Shaggy & Scooby-Doo Get a Clue! and Scooby-Doo! Mystery Incorporated.

The series premiered on September 14, 2002, and ran for three seasons before ending on July 21, 2006. The title song was performed by Canadian band Simple Plan. Reruns of the series have aired on both Cartoon Network (2003–2016) and Boomerang (2006–2020) in the United States. It also aired on Teletoon in Canada, and CBBC  in the UK, then CITV.

In 2019, the show was made available to stream on Netflix in the US. In 2021, the rights were turned over to HBO Max.

Episodes

Characters

Main
 Fred: The leader of the Mystery, Inc. gang who is the master of making traps to catch the villains. However, sometimes the traps fail to work; Shaggy and Scooby mess them up then use the parts to catch the villain in their own fashion. Voiced by Frank Welker.
 Daphne: The fashionable, rich glamor girl of the gang who defends herself with her great fighting skills, although she can still fill the role of damsel in distress, often being captured by the villains. She is also quite ditzy and accident prone. Voiced by Grey DeLisle.
 Velma: The smartest of the gang, and wears glasses because she is myopic. She has to fight back the advances of semi-recurring Gibby Norton, who does devious things, thinking it will win her over. Voiced by Mindy Cohn.
 Shaggy: A beatnik slacker who's friends with Scooby. He and Scooby are usually scared and hungry; a running gag in the show. He is also known to have a high metabolism, and also is rich. At his voice actor's request, Shaggy was made into a vegetarian for this series. Voiced by Casey Kasem.
 Scooby-Doo: A clumsy brown Great Dane who's friends with Shaggy. Two things that they have in common are that they love food and are always afraid of things including monsters. Voiced by Frank Welker.

Recurring
Characters in the series who appear more than once:
 Elliot Blender: A competitive, jerkish spoiled child who often loses to Velma in contests. Voiced by Kimberly Brooks.
 Melbourne O'Reilly: An Australian adventurer/explorer who is one of Fred's heroes (he is also based on Steve Irwin and Indiana Jones) Voiced by Steven Blum.
 J.J. Hakimoto: A famous, over enthusiastic, Asian director. Voiced by Brian Tochi.
 Gibby Norton: A nerd who has a crush on Velma, who hates the sight of him. He often turns out to be the villain to impress Velma, never succeeding. Gibby is modelled after his voice actor, Eddie Deezen.
 Burr Batson: Cocky southern professional racer who drives a monster truck. Voiced by James Arnold Taylor.
 Professor Laslow Ostwald: An inventor whom the gang meets. Voiced by Dave Foley, later by James Arnold Taylor. He first appears in "High-Tech House of Horrors" where his "House of the Future's" AI "Shari" goes haywire attacking the tourists. Though the gang suspects him it is later revealed that "Shari" itself is responsible (as she was angry at the Professor due to him getting all of the attention). The gang defeated "Shari" by ignoring her (as attention was what she wanted) causing her to overload. Professor Ostwald also appears in "E-Scream" at a "Video Game Convention" where his new invention the cuddly "Osomons" turn evil. It is later discovered that the whole mystery was actually a VR simulation Velma was trying out.
 The Hex Girls: Thorn, Dusk and Luna, are the members of the famous eco-goth rock band, The Hex Girls, with whom Scooby and the gang are acquainted with, ever since their first meeting in Scooby-Doo! and the Witch's Ghost. Thorn is voiced by Jennifer Hale, Dusk by Jane Wiedlin and Luna by Kimberly Brooks.
 Mr. B: The owner of the Secret Six puppies. His full name is never revealed. He is voiced by Jeff Bennett. He also appears to be based on actor John Turturro given his accent and appearance.
 Crissie: A Golden Retriever who is the Secret Six's mother. She appears in "Homeward Hound" and "Farmed and Dangerous.” Unlike the Secret Six she does not appear in “Gold Paw”.
 The Secret Six puppies: Maize, Flax, Jingle, Knox, 14-Karat and Bling-Bling. They are six very well-trained, prize-winning Golden Retriever puppies who have a knack for getting into trouble. Maize and Knox are voiced by Jennifer Hale, Jingle is voiced by Colleen O'Shaughnessey, Flax is voiced by Dee Bradley Baker, Bling-Bling is voiced by Grey DeLisle, and 14-Karat is voiced by Frank Welker.
 Nancy Chang: Reporter in episodes "There's No Creature Like Snow Creature" and "Riva Ras Regas". Voiced by Lauren Tom.

Production
For this incarnation of the franchise, Frank Welker, the voice of Fred, took over as the voice of Scooby (replacing both Don Messick, the original voice of Scooby who died in 1997, and Scott Innes, the second voice of the character in the made-for-video films released between 1998 and 2001). Casey Kasem returned as Shaggy, making his comeback as the character in 2002 after the production team decided to make Shaggy a vegetarian. This would also be the final series Kasem voiced the character, continuing to voice Shaggy in the direct-to-video Scooby-Doo films until retiring from the role in 2009; Grey DeLisle returned as the role of Daphne (having previously voiced the character in Scooby-Doo and the Cyber Chase). Actress Mindy Cohn took over for B. J. Ward as the role of Velma.

The series itself is a modernized version of the original Where Are You! series. It takes place in the 21st century and is more "realistic" than the previous, more cartoony incarnations, and features music from contemporary genres and all-new, original sound effects to replace the classic Hanna-Barbera sound effects. Even a distinctive thunderclap sound that was used frequently on older Scooby-Doo TV series was very rarely used on the series. A laugh track was only used for the Halloween special. The classic formula was also frequently parodied throughout (in a manner similar to A Pup Named Scooby-Doo), including the line "And I would've gotten away with it too, if it weren't for you meddling kids." As such, it returns to the formulaic version of humans in monster disguises, rather than the real monsters and ghosts of the prior four direct-to-video films (or the 1980s versions that preceded them).

The show was produced by Warner Bros. Animation, the successor to Warner Bros. Cartoons which was the studio famous for bringing the Looney Tunes/Merrie Melodies to life, which had by this time absorbed Hanna-Barbera Productions in 2001, after being bought by Time Warner from Turner Broadcasting System since their merger on October 10, 1996. As is the standard for other classic Hanna-Barbera properties (Yogi Bear, The Flintstones, Wacky Races, etc.), the studio is still credited as the copyright owner, and Joseph Barbera, co-founder and co-chairman of the Hanna-Barbera studios, served as an executive producer alongside Sander Schwartz. William Hanna, longtime partner of Barbera, had died the year before. Wang Film Productions, DongWoo Animation Co. Ltd, and Lotto Animation contributed some of the animation for this series.

It is the first Scooby-Doo series to be produced in 16:9 widescreen, although it was cropped in 4:3 when broadcast.

The band Simple Plan is strongly connected to What's New, Scooby-Doo?. They perform the theme song (written by Rich Dickerson), and appeared as themselves in the episode "Simple Plan and the Invisible Madman". Two of their songs appeared in chase scenes: "I'd Do Anything" in the episode "It's Mean, It's Green, It's the Mystery Machine" and "You Don't Mean Anything" in "Simple Plan and the Invisible Madman", which also had the song "The Worst Day Ever" serve as the song the band plays during a scene where they practice, and a scene where they are in concert. Also, they contributed to the theatrical movie Scooby-Doo 2: Monsters Unleashed.

Each season included one holiday-themed special along with the other 13 regular episodes. The first season's special was A Scooby-Doo Christmas (2002), followed by A Scooby-Doo Halloween (2003) and A Scooby-Doo Valentine (2005).

What's New aired for three seasons on The WB Television Network's "Kids' WB" programming block as a half-hour program, before being put on an indefinite hiatus in 2005, although the last episode, "E-Scream", was aired on Cartoon Network. Reruns have been shown on both Cartoon Network and its sister channel Boomerang. It also debuted on Boomerang and Cartoon Network in the United Kingdom and Ireland. In the United Kingdom, it aired on CBBC from September 2003 until November 2015, and aired on CITV in 2016. Since July 9, 2021, What's New, Scooby-Doo? has aired as reruns on Cartoon Network UK.

Reception
Common Sense Media gave the series a three out of five stars, writing, "Parents need to know that while there aren't many life lessons to be learned from an episode of this show, kids will enjoy the antics of the Scooby gang as they stumble upon and solve mysteries. Only very young children might find the show's puzzles and monsters frightening."

Home media
Warner Home Video has released the entire series on DVD in Region 1. The series was initially released in ten volumes of four or five episodes between 2003 and 2006, as well as in the United Kingdom from 2004 to 2006 and later re-released, in the United States, in season sets in 2007–2008. In the UK, the volumes were released in a two disc set on May 30, 2011. A box set was released on October 29, 2007 in the UK containing all ten volumes in a complete disc set.

References

External links

 Official Scooby-Doo website
 
 What's New, Scooby-Doo? at the Big Cartoon DataBase

2002 American television series debuts
2006 American television series endings
2000s American animated television series
2000s American mystery television series
The WB original programming
Kids' WB original shows
Cartoon Network original programming
Boomerang (TV network) original programming
Scooby-Doo television series
American children's animated action television series
American children's animated adventure television series
American children's animated comedy television series
American children's animated fantasy television series
American children's animated horror television series
American children's animated mystery television series
Television series by Warner Bros. Animation
American animated television spin-offs
English-language television shows
Teen animated television series